Jan Serr (born 1943) is an American visual artist who produces a wide range of art including oil paintings, drawings, photographs and prints such as monotypes, lithographs, and etchings.

Early life

Jan Serr was born in Dayton, Ohio, and spent her formative years in Phoenix, Arizona, and Milwaukee, Wisconsin.  Music was an integral part of her early life. She began studies in classical music, training primarily in voice and piano with additional work in music theory and French horn between the ages of eight and twenty.

Education

Serr studied at the Wisconsin Conservatory of Music during the 1950s and later enrolled at Carroll University as a music major.  She decided to explore other areas of study and transferred to the University of Wisconsin–Milwaukee (UWM) where she studied with Schomer Lichtner, John Colt, Lawrence Rathsack and Fred Berman. Early influences include the West Coast Figurative painters such as Richard Diebenkorn, Nathan Oliveira, and Wayne Thiebaud, as well as mid-century European artists, most importantly Max Beckmann, Oskar Kokoschka, and Emil Nolde.

Serr received her Bachelor of Arts degree from UWM in 1964 and went on to complete her studies in the university’s MFA program. She held her thesis exhibition in 1968 and was awarded her master's degree that year. In 1969 Serr taught painting, drawing, and design at the University of Wisconsin-Stevens Point and in 1970 moved to Acton, Ontario, where she taught painting and drawing at Sheridan College Institute of Technology and Advanced Learning in Oakville, Ontario.

In 2014 she taught a course on monotype printing at Penland School of Crafts in Spruce Pine, North Carolina.

Career

In 1972 Serr moved to Toronto, Ontario, and began exhibiting with Marlborough Godard Gallery in Toronto, Montreal, and Calgary. In 1976 her first solo exhibition was held in the Montreal gallery.

Internationally, Serr has participated three times in the U.S. Department of State Art in Embassies program.

In 2010 Serr was awarded the Distinguished Alumnus Award in the Field of Art and Design by the University of Wisconsin-Milwaukee Alumni Association.

In 2016, the University of Wisconsin-Milwaukee, Peck School of the Arts, named a new sixth floor multipurpose space the Jan Serr Studio.  Construction began 2017, with a Grand Opening September 28, 2019, which featured the world premiere of Kamran Ince's "A Grand American Celebration" performed by the UW-Milwaukee Peck School of the Arts Wind Ensemble, under the direction of Dr. John Climer.

Themes and Exhibitions

Landscapes are significant in Serr’s oeuvre. Works from the Long Point Bay series are held in major Canadian collections including the Art Gallery of Ontario. The Sky Over Land series was exhibited in solo shows at Marlborough Godard Gallery in Calgary, Alberta, Canada, and the Wustum Art Museum in Racine, Wisconsin. Works from the series Trees in Water, Driftless, Downstream, and Leaves and Branches were shown as part of the U.S. Department of State Art in Embassies Program.

A solo exhibition, Jan Serr: Twenty-Year Retrospective: Landscape & Figurative Paintings, was held at the Rahr West Art Museum in Manitowoc, Wisconsin, in 1985.

Representational figures and self-portraits are a substantial part of Serr’s work, explored through painting, drawing, and print mediums. About Face was a solo, forty-year survey of self-portraits and figurative work shown at the University of Wisconsin-Milwaukee Peck School of the Arts in 2011. Summer Dances, exhibited by the Museum of Wisconsin Art in 2014, is a recent series representing dancers in motion.

Two books of photographs, "Then & Now: China" and "Smoke & Mirrors: India" were published January 2017.  These are large format books, 10.5x10.5 in (26 x 26 cm).  Serr wrote a preface for each book, detailing when and how the photographs were taken. "I was going to be working in the manner of a group of photographers that I greatly admire: Saul Leiter, Helen Levitt, and Garry Winogrand. . . I would not be the studio photographer, but I would be the candid, spontaneous, quick, prolific street photographer."  The preface also addresses the relationship, and sometimes tension, of her work as a photographer and a painter.  Nishant Batsha, Indian-American scholar, wrote an Introduction to Smoke & Mirrors titled "Five Travelers": "The history of India is in many ways a history of travelers."

The Warehouse, a Milwaukee museum, presented "Jan Serr: A Painter's Photographs of India," September 13-December 13, 2019, Serr's first public exhibition of her photographs.  Some of the photographs were of northern India, included in "Smoke & Mirrors: India", while a new body of photographs of southern India were also presented.  A catalog "The Elephant's Eye", a Plumb Press publication edited by Serr and Kate Hawley, was published in conjunction with the exhibition.

Museums and collections

Art by Jan Serr is represented in many notable collections, including the following museums and public institutions: Milwaukee Art Museum, Milwaukee, WI; University of Wisconsin – Milwaukee, Milwaukee, WI; Haggerty Museum of Art, Marquette University, Milwaukee, WI; Racine Art Museum, Racine, WI; Paine Art Center, Oshkosh, WI; Rahr-West Museum, Manitowoc, WI; The Warehouse MKE, Milwaukee, WI; Wingspread, The Johnson Foundation, Racine, WI; Ontario Museum of Art, Toronto, Ontario; Canada Council, Ottawa, Ontario; Hart House, University of Toronto, Toronto, Ontario; Mount Allison College, Mount Allison, New Brunswick.

In addition to private collections, Serr’s work is held by these corporations: Quarles & Brady, Milwaukee, WI; Wells Fargo, Milwaukee, WI; Norwest Bank, Milwaukee, WI; Johnson International, Racine, WI; Spectrum Brands, Madison, WI; Dow Chemical, Midland, MI; Piper, Jaffray, Minneapolis MN; Sprint, Kansas City, MO; Brigham Women’s Hospital, Boston, MA; Reader’s Digest, Pleasantville, NY; Bank of Montreal, Montreal, Quebec; Bank of Nova Scotia, Toronto, Ontario; Imperial Oil Ltd., Toronto, Ontario; Shell Oil Canada, Toronto, Ontario; Gulf Oil Canada Ltd., Calgary, Alberta.

References

University of Wisconsin–Milwaukee alumni
Living people
1943 births
Artists from Dayton, Ohio
American women painters
Painters from Wisconsin
21st-century American women artists